Danish Division 1 ( or ) is the second-level professional men's ice hockey league in Denmark. It lies below the Metal Ligaen.

Teams

2020–21 season 
West
 Aalborg (AaB)
 Esbjerg IK
 Frederikshavn IK
Jutland Vikings
Odense IK
Vojens IK
East
 Gentofte Stars
 Gladsaxe Ishockey
 Herlev IK
 Hvidovre IK
 Rungsted IK
 Rødovre SIK

References 

Dan
Professional ice hockey leagues in Denmark